Hayley Marie Reichardt (born April 27, 1999) is an American weightlifter. She is a three-time medalist, including two gold medals, at the Pan American Weightlifting Championships.

Career 

She competed at the 2019 Junior World Weightlifting Championships held in Suva, Fiji where she won the bronze medal in the women's 49 kg event. She also won the bronze medal in the women's 49 kg Clean & Jerk event.

She won the silver medal in her event at the 2020 Pan American Weightlifting Championships held in Santo Domingo, Dominican Republic. She won the gold medal in her event at the 2021 Pan American Weightlifting Championships held in Guayaquil, Ecuador and the 2022 Pan American Weightlifting Championships held in Bogotá, Colombia.

She won the bronze medal in the women's 49kg Clean & Jerk event at the 2022 World Weightlifting Championships held in Bogotá, Colombia.

Achievements

References

External links 
 

Living people
1999 births
Place of birth missing (living people)
American female weightlifters
Pan American Weightlifting Championships medalists
21st-century American women